Dmitry Valdomarovich Lentsevich (born 20 June 1983) is a Belarusian football coach and a former player. He is the manager of the reserves squad of Dinamo Minsk.

His brother Alyaksandr Lyantsevich is also a former professional footballer.

Career
Lentsevich joined Bohemians Prague on a free transfer from FC Dnipro Dnipropetrovsk in January 2008. He had previously made 20 appearances for FC Torpedo Moscow in the Russian Premier League and Russian First Division.

Honours
Dinamo Minsk
Belarusian Premier League champion: 2004

References

External links
 
 
 

1983 births
Living people
Belarusian footballers
Belarus international footballers
Belarus under-21 international footballers
Belarusian expatriate footballers
Expatriate footballers in Russia
Expatriate footballers in Ukraine
Expatriate footballers in the Czech Republic
Belarusian expatriate sportspeople in Ukraine
Belarusian expatriate sportspeople in Russia
Belarusian Premier League players
Russian Premier League players
Czech First League players
FC RUOR Minsk players
FC Dinamo Minsk players
FC Dinamo-Juni Minsk players
FC Torpedo Moscow players
FC Dnipro players
FK Bohemians Prague (Střížkov) players
SK Dynamo České Budějovice players
FC Minsk players
Association football defenders
People from Lida
Sportspeople from Grodno Region